Duncan Franklin Rousseau (February 10, 1945 – October 17, 2017) was a Canadian professional ice hockey forward. He played 135 games in the World Hockey Association (WHA) with the Winnipeg Jets.

Rousseau died of cancer October 17, 2017 at Riverview Health Centre in Winnipeg, Manitoba.

Awards and achievements
MJHL Second All-Star Team (1965)
Turnbull Cup MJHL Championship (1965)

References

External links

1945 births
2017 deaths
Baltimore Clippers players
Canadian ice hockey forwards
Dayton Gems players
Ice hockey people from Manitoba
People from Eastman Region, Manitoba
Rochester Americans players
Winnipeg Braves players
Winnipeg Jets (WHA) players
Deaths from cancer in Manitoba